The Ventadour River is a tributary of the south shore of Robert Lake flowing into Eeyou Istchee Baie-James (municipality), in Jamésie, in the administrative region of Nord-du-Québec, Quebec, Canada.

This river crosses successively the cantons of Ventadour and Feuquières. Forestry is the main economic activity of the sector; recreational tourism activities, second. A logging camp has been established on the west bank of Lake Ventadour near a forest road.

The south of the Ventadour River Valley is served by route 212 which connects Obedjiwan to La Tuque and passes south of Lac Dubois. From there, the forest road R1032 (North–south direction) passes on the west side of the Ventadour River.

The surface of the Ventadour River is usually frozen from early November to mid-May, however, safe ice circulation is generally from mid-November to mid-April.

Geography

Toponymy 
At various times in history, this territory has been occupied by the Attikameks, the Algonquin and the Cree.

The toponym "Ventadour River" was made official on December 5, 1968, at the Commission de toponymie du Québec, when it was created.

Notes and references

See also 

Rivers of Nord-du-Québec
Jamésie
Nottaway River drainage basin